The 2017 iHeartRadio Music Awards were held on March 5, 2017 at The Forum in Inglewood, California, and hosted by Ryan Seacrest. The list of nominations was announced on January 3, 2017. Drake received the most nominations with fifteen categories, followed by The Chainsmokers with twelve.

Performances
The following artists performed at the show:

Winners & nominees
The nominees were announced on January 3, 2017. Winners are highlighted in boldface.

Category mistake
The day of the ceremony, Zayn was incorrectly announced as the winner for the Best Music Video category, and he accepted the award. The error was not caught until the next day, when the actual winner, Fifth Harmony, was announced on the iHeartRadio's official Twitter account. Zayn was then announced as the winner of the category "Best Solo Breakout".

References

2017 in American music
2017 in Los Angeles County, California
2017 music awards
2017
March 2017 events in the United States